Nogometni klub Trešnjevka  is a professional association football club from the city of Zagreb that is situated in Croatia.

Formed in 1926 under the name Panonija, since 1929 the clubs has been known as Trešnjevka. It was promoted to the Yugoslav First League in 1963 and played a European competition that same season. However, Trešnjevka never had high results in its three-year stay in the top flight (11th, 14th and 16th). After relegation in 1966, the club never returned to the First League again.

Today, Trešnjevka plays in the 3. NL where it plays its home games at the 2,000 seater Igralište Trešnjevka-Graba Stadium.

Honours

Domestic

League

Yugoslav Second League:
 Winners (1): 1962–63 
First League of Zagreb:
 Winners (1): 2018-19

European games
 1R = First round

Notable managers
  Ernest Dubac (1959–1966)

External links
Official site

Association football clubs established in 1926
Football clubs in Croatia
Football clubs in Zagreb
Football clubs in Yugoslavia
1926 establishments in Croatia